Monirul Mondal (born 1 January 1986 in Jharkhand) is an Indian professional footballer who plays as a striker for Mohammedan S.C. (Kolkata) in the I-League.

Career

Mohammedan
Monirul made his professional debut for Mohammedan on 11 March against East Bengal F.C. at the Salt Lake Stadium in which he started the match and played till 26th minute before being replaced by Taro Hasegawa as Mohammedan lost the match 2-1.

Career statistics

References

External links 
 Profile at Goal.com 
 Profile at I-League.org

1986 births
Living people
Indian footballers
Mohammedan SC (Kolkata) players
Association football forwards
Footballers from Jharkhand
I-League players